The 2017 Minnesota United FC season was the eighth season of Minnesota United FC's existence and their first season in Major League Soccer, the top-tier of American soccer. United played at TCF Bank Stadium and was coached by Adrian Heath, who still coaches United. Outside of MLS, Minnesota United also participated in the 2017 U.S. Open Cup, as well as various preseason competitions.

This was the first year that a first-division American soccer team had played in Minnesota since the Minnesota Strikers in 1984. Between that time, the Minnesota Thunder and the NASL Minnesota United FC played in the second division.

Club

Transfers

Transfers In

MLS Expansion Draft 

The MLS Expansion Draft took place on December 13, 2016.

MLS SuperDraft 

Any player marked with a * is part of the Generation Adidas program.

Rounds 1 and 2 of the SuperDraft took place on January 13, 2017.
Rounds 3 and 4 of the SuperDraft took place on January 17, 2017.

Transfers Out

Loans In

Loans Out

Friendlies

Timbers preseason tournament

Competitions

Overview

{| class="wikitable" style="text-align: center"
|-
!rowspan=2|Competition
!colspan=8|Record
|-
!
!
!
!
!
!
!
!
|-
| MLS

|-
| MLS Cup

|-
| U.S. Open Cup

|-
! Total

MLS

Overall table

Results summary

Results by round

Matches

U.S. Open Cup

Player statistics

Top scorers

As of October 22, 2017.

Shutouts

Appearances

As of June 5, 2017.

Discipline

As of October 4, 2017.

Attendance

As of October 7, 2017

References 

2017
2017 Major League Soccer season
American soccer clubs 2017 season
2017 in sports in Minnesota